The Inglewood Transit Connector Project is a  fully elevated, automated guideway transit system proposed in Inglewood, California, that will connect the Downtown Inglewood station on the K Line of the Los Angeles Metro Rail system to the major sports and entertainment venues in the city: Kia Forum, SoFi Stadium, Hollywood Park Casino and the under-construction Intuit Dome. The project is planned to break ground in 2024 and begin operations in late 2027, ahead of the 2028 Summer Olympics that will use some of the venues.

History 

The project is part of the Envision Inglewood plan, that was the culmination of several transportation and mobility initiatives to be undertaken by the City including a citywide event transportation management and operations plan, mobility plan, neighborhood protection plan, and the Inglewood Transit Connector Project that would connect the under-construction Downtown Inglewood station on the Metro K Line to Kia Forum, SoFi Stadium, mixed-use development at Hollywood Park, and the Intuit Dome.

In April 2020, the City was awarded $95.2 million from the California State Transportation Agency's Transit and Intercity Rail Capital Program, and in July 2021 Metro allocated $233.7 million in Measure R sales tax funds. As of 2021, the City has secured approximately $328.9 million in committed funding for the implementation of the Project out of the $1 billion dollars needed.

Procurement 
The City plans to complete the project using an alternative delivery approach as public–private partnership. In December 2021, the City has launched the procurement process for the project with two parallel requests for qualifications (RFQ) issued to the private sector: one for the design, construction, financing, operations and maintenance of the project and one for the proposed the transit technology to be used.

System 
The automated transit system will be fully elevated and travel from the Metro K Line's Downtown Inglewood Station at Market Street/Florence Avenue southbound along Market Street, eastbound along Manchester Boulevard, southbound along Prairie Avenue and terminate at Hardy Avenue. The Project will have three stations including one at Market Street / Florence Avenue, Manchester Boulevard / Prairie Avenue, and Hardy Street / Prairie Avenue. The transit system technology and vehicles are expected to be selected through a competitive procurement process.

References

External links 
Envision Inglewood project site

Inglewood, California
Proposed railway lines in California
2026 in rail transport
Transportation in Los Angeles County, California
People mover systems in the United States